Syndemis cedricola, the Lebanese cedar shoot moth, is a species of moth of the family Tortricidae. It is found in Lebanon and Turkey.

The wingspan is 15–19 mm. The forewings are brown with transversal, olive-green stripes and dark brown spots.

The larvae feed on Cedrus libani, causing damage to the leaves and buds. Larvae are active from April to May and in November.

References

Moths described in 1974
Archipini